The national anthem of Bolivia, also known as "" ("'Bolivians, a Propitious Fate'") and originally titled the "" ("Patriotic Song"), was adopted in 1851. José Ignacio de Sanjinés, a signer of both the Bolivian Declaration of Independence and the first Bolivian Constitution, wrote the lyrics. The music was composed by an Italian, Leopoldo Benedetto Vincenti.

It is a march in 4/4 time, although it is popularly sung in 12/8. It was premiered in the city of La Paz, in front of the Palacio de Gobierno, at noon on 18 November 1845, by about 90 instrumentalists belonging to the military bands of the 5th, 6th and 8th battalions.

In 1851, during the government of General Manuel Isidoro Belzu, the national anthem of Bolivia was made official by a supreme decree, and it was sent out to print for distribution in schools. It has since been performed and sung in all official school functions.

History

Background 
In the city of Chuquisaca (modern Sucre) in 1835, the composition called "" ("National March") came to light, the first national anthem, the work of the Peruvian teacher Pedro Ximénez Abril Tirado, who was the chapelmaster of Chuquisaca Cathedral. This composition did not become official, quite possibly due to the creation, organisation and subsequent elimination of the Peru–Bolivian Confederation (1836–1839).

The original scores are found in the Historical Archive of Chuquisaca Cathedral, where they are part of the musical heritage of Bolivia. A piano performance, performed by the teacher María Antonieta García Meza de Pacheco, exists in a compilation on CD as a tribute to the work of Ximenez Abrill Tirado.

National anthem 
Once the independence and sovereignty of Bolivia was consolidated in the Battle of Ingavi on 18 November 1841, the need for a patriotic song was noted again, because General José Ballivián, then president of Bolivia, noted that small bands of the Army were not managing to conquer popular fervour by performing inherited Spanish marches and popular pieces.

It was under these circumstances that Ballivián learned of the visit to Chile of Italian teacher and composer Leopoldo Benedetto Vincenti, whom he invited in 1844 to exercise the position of general director of bands of the Bolivian army and to compose, under contract, the music of the "" ("Patriotic Song"), under which name it was to be known at the time. Vincenti arrived in La Paz in September 1844 and found the musical bands in a dire state, as could be established in his family letters. His work was exhausting; many times, he went to bed dressed to go to the barracks at dawn. The trials were long and pressing. Vincenti rejected one text after another; it was then that lawyer and poet José Ignacio Sanjinéz presented him with the verses of what is now the Bolivian national anthem, originally written in Spanish.

In the La Paz Plaza Murillo at noon on 18 November 1845, after Te Deum was performed at the Cathedral of La Paz in honour of the Battle of Ingavi, the military bands of the Battalions 5th, 6th and 8th played, for the first time, the chords of the Bolivian national anthem. Ballivián came out excited to one of the balconies of the Palacio Quemado, profusely congratulating the performance.

The new theatre was packed: the president of the republic, José Ballivián, attended with his cabinet; prefectural, municipal and public authorities gathered.

Lyrics

Spanish original

In indigenous languages

Notes

References

See also 
 Read full texts on Wikisource
 Read full Spanish texts on the Spanish Wikisource

External links 
 Bolivia: Himno Nacional de Bolivia - Audio of the national anthem of Bolivia, with information and lyrics (archive link)

Bolivian songs
Bolivia
National symbols of Bolivia
Spanish-language songs
Bolivia
National anthem compositions in B-flat major